Animaniacs: The Great Edgar Hunt is an action-adventure video game, released in North America, Europe and Australia in 2005. It is based on the cartoon series Animaniacs from Warner Bros. and features the same voice actors for the main characters. The game is one of multiple Animaniacs video games. It was the first Animaniacs-related project to be released since the animated comedy film Wakko's Wish in 1999. It was released on the GameCube, PlayStation 2, and Xbox, with the latter two versions being released only in Europe, while the GameCube version was released in both Europe and North America. A North American PlayStation 2 and Xbox versions of the game were advertised but unfortunately cancelled.

Plot
Frustrated by being "overlooked", film director C. C. Deville steals the "Edgars" (statuettes that are a parody of the Oscars) and threatens to melt them all unless studio chairman Thaddeus Plotz gives him a lucrative contract. While carrying out his evil plot, Deville's dim-witted assistant accidentally crashes his getaway blimp into the Warner Bros. water tower. This scatters 44 of the 45 stolen Edgars across the studio lot and releases Yakko, Wakko, and Dot, who agree to search for the missing awards. The many different types of levels include: Ye Old West, Spooky Movie, Once Upon A Time, King O'Sullivan's Mines, and The Epic. The final level takes place in the sky chasing and shooting down Deville's blimp. In the end, Ralph T. Guard and Plotz end up capturing Deville and the Warners, mistaking them to also be part of Deville's plan. As the Edgars ceremony finally continues, the Warners proceed to torment Deville, who got accidentally trapped in the water tower, which got rebuilt by Pinky and the Brain for one of their latest plans to take over the world, with the Warners.

Reception

The game received mixed-to-positive reviews upon release. GameSpot gave it 7.1 out of 10, stating that "The Great Edgar Hunt is a good, if not very original, platformer in its own right, offering up some funny writing and interesting environments to explore". According to GamingNexus, the game is "recommended to loyal fans of the series. It doesn’t bring anything fresh to the gaming table, but offers a substantial adventure that should take at least six hours to complete. The quality is uncommon for a licensed title and the show’s charm is intact for the most part. For adventure fans I suggest something meatier like Zelda; Edgar Hunt will be nothing but a passing amusement to the hardcore audience".

Notes

References

External links
Official website

2005 video games
3D platform games
Action-adventure games
GameCube games
PlayStation 2 games
Great Edgar Hunt
Video games developed in the United Kingdom
Xbox games
Single-player video games
UTV Ignition Games games